Axiodes is a genus of moths in the family Geometridae erected by Warren in 1894.

Species
 Axiodes inaequalis Prout, 1915
 Axiodes insciata (Felder & Rogenhofer, 1875)
 Axiodes tripartita Prout, 1915

References

Ennominae
Geometridae genera